Lee Wook-jae (이욱재, born 20 February 1965) was a South Korean fencer. He competed in the individual and team sabre events at the 1988 Summer Olympics. He worked for South Korean men's sabre national team, which took gold medal for team sabre event in 2012 Summer Olympics, and Japanese sabre national team as a head coach. As of May 2013, after the end of Korfanty Cup in Chicago, South Korea's men's sabre team is ranked #1 in FIE ranking system.

References

External links
 

1965 births
Living people
South Korean male sabre fencers
Olympic fencers of South Korea
Fencers at the 1988 Summer Olympics
Asian Games medalists in fencing
Fencers at the 1986 Asian Games
Fencers at the 1990 Asian Games
Asian Games silver medalists for South Korea
Medalists at the 1986 Asian Games
Medalists at the 1990 Asian Games